Borac Hall Near Morava, commonly known as Borac Hall, is an indoor arena in Čačak, Serbia. It has a capacity of 3,000 people. It is home arena of a basketball club Borac.

Gallery

See also
 List of indoor arenas in Serbia

References

Sport in Čačak
Indoor arenas in Serbia
Basketball venues in Serbia